Sorkhu-e Olya (also Romanized as Sorkhū-e ‘Olyā) is a village in Esfandaqeh Rural District, in the Central District of Jiroft County, Kerman Province, Iran. At the 2006 census, its population was 16, in 4 families.

References 

Populated places in Jiroft County